Harold Foster may refer to:

Hal Foster, cartoonist
Hal Foster (art critic), university professor and art critic
Harold E. Foster, basketball player and coach
Harold D. Foster, Canadian geographer and geomorphologist

See also
Harry Foster (disambiguation)